Vesna Dunimagloska (born 4 June 1976) is a Macedonian alpine skier. She competed for Yugoslavia in two events at the 1992 Winter Olympics.

References

External links
 

1976 births
Living people
Yugoslav female alpine skiers
Olympic alpine skiers of Yugoslavia
Alpine skiers at the 1992 Winter Olympics
Sportspeople from Bitola